Hafsteinn Ægir Geirsson (born 4 August 1980 in Reykjavík) is a retired Icelandic sailor, who specialized in the Laser class. He represented his nation Iceland in two editions of the Olympic Games (2000 and 2004), and has also been training throughout most of his sporting career for Þytur Sailing Regatta.

Hafsteinn made his official debut at the 2000 Summer Olympics in Sydney, where he placed forty-second in the Laser class with a net grade of 355, after having decided to pull himself out in the last race due to yachting malfunction.

At the 2004 Summer Olympics in Athens, Hafsteinn qualified for his second Icelandic team, as a 24-year-old, in the Laser class by granting a tripartite invitation from the International Sailing Federation. Sailing through the race series with a similar effort from the previous Olympics, Geirsson recorded a satisfying grade of 344 net points to upgrade his position to fortieth in a fleet of forty-two sailors.

Hafsteinn is also a cyclist. He has won several Icelandic competitions and the Faroese Kring Føroyar (Tour of Faroe Islands) which he has won four times, 2005, 2006, 2007 and 2008.

Major results

2005
 1st Overall Tour of Faroe Islands
2006
 1st Overall Tour of Faroe Islands
2007
 1st Overall Tour of Faroe Islands
2008
 1st  Road race, National Road Championships
 1st Overall Tour of Faroe Islands
2009
 1st  Road race, National Road Championships
2010
 2nd Road race, National Road Championships
2011
 1st  Road race, National Road Championships
2012
 3rd Road race, National Road Championships
2013
 2nd Road race, National Road Championships
2014
 2nd Road race, National Road Championships
2017
 National Road Championships
3rd Road race
3rd Time trial
2018
 2nd Road race, National Road Championships
 2nd National Cyclo-Cross Championships
2019
 3rd Road race, National Road Championships
2020
 1st  Road race, National Road Championships

References

External links
 
 
 

1980 births
Living people
Icelandic male sailors (sport)
Icelandic male cyclists
Olympic sailors of Iceland
Sailors at the 2000 Summer Olympics – Laser
Sailors at the 2004 Summer Olympics – Laser
Sportspeople from Reykjavík